Newyddion S4C (S4C News) is a Welsh-language news programme consisting of Welsh, UK, and international news, produced daily by BBC Cymru Wales and broadcast on S4C.

Overview
The main evening programme (branded ) is broadcast each weekday evening at 7:30pm with shorter editions airing throughout the day and at varying times on Saturday and Sunday evenings.

Five-minute updates are broadcast at midday, mid-afternoon (2pm, 3pm) and evenings (8:55pm)

Dewi Llwyd, who presented the programme for almost 30 years, was dropped from the presentation team in 2013.

S4C weather forecasts are now broadcast in the news programme after BBC Cymru Wales moved into its new headquarters in Central Square, Cardiff.

Awards 
 won the 2012 BAFTA Cymru Award for News Coverage for a special programme broadcast from New York to mark the tenth anniversary of the 11 September 2001 attacks.

At the 2013 BAFTA  Awards ceremony  was mistakenly awarded the News Coverage award. The award was later correctly presented to ITV Cymru Wales.

At the 2015 BAFTA  Awards  9 was awarded the News Coverage Award for a special programme on the Paris Attacks.

They also won the News Coverage Award at the 2016 BAFTA  awards for a programme about the refugee crisis.

Ratings 
Viewing figures for  range from 180,000 to 250,000 according to S4C's weekly ratings report.

On-air team

Anchor 
Bethan Rhys Roberts
Rhodri Llywelyn

Daytime
 Sara Esyllt
 Ifan Gwyn Davies
 Lois Angharad
 Aled Huw
 Cennydd Davies

Additional presenters
Aled Huw
Rhodri Llwyd
Janet Ebenezer
Gwenllian Glyn
Telor Iwan
Nia Cerys

District correspondents

North Wales
Sion Tecwyn – North West
Dafydd Gwynn – North West
Dafydd Evans – North East
Elen Wyn – North East

South Wales
Owain Evans – Cardiff
Ellis Roberts – Cardiff/Business

Mid and West Wales
Craig Duggan – Mid Wales
Mari Grug – Mid Wales
Aled Scourfield – West Wales
Rhys Williams - Swansea

Specialist correspondents

Owain Clarke – Health 
Gwyn Loader – Chief Correspondent 
James Williams – Brexit
Steffan Messenger – Environment
Huw Thomas – Arts and Media

Bethan Lewis – Education
Vaughan Roderick – Welsh Affairs Editor 
Elliw Gwawr - Westminster

References

External links
Newyddion S4C

1982 British television series debuts
1980s Welsh television series
1990s Welsh television series
2000s Welsh television series
2010s Welsh television series
2020s Welsh television series
BBC Cymru Wales television shows
BBC Regional News shows
S4C original programming
Television shows set in Cardiff
Television shows set in Wales
Welsh television news shows